An England cricket team toured Australia in the 1897–98 season to play a five-match Test series against the Australia national cricket team. The team was captained by Andrew Stoddart and, except in the Test matches when it was called England, it was generally known as A. E. Stoddart's XI.  The playing strength of the team was weakened by Stoddart acceding to a request from the Australians to bring “new blood”. As a result, established players including JT Brown, Albert Ward and Bobby Peel were not selected.

Stoddart only played in the third and fourth Test matches, following the news before the first Test that his mother had died. Archie MacLaren captained England in the first, second and fifth Tests. England won the first Test comfortably by nine wickets after Ranjisinhji played one of the great Test innings. Weakened by illness he batted at number 7 he scored 175 in 223 minutes, hitting 26 fours, a performance which set up the victory. Australia then emphatically won the next four Tests.

Australia, captained by Harry Trott, therefore regained The Ashes. Australia were well served in batting by Joe Darling (he scored 537 runs, including three centuries), Clem Hill and Charlie McLeod; and in bowling by Ernie Jones, Monty Noble and Hugh Trumble. J. T. Hearne and Tom Richardson were England's most successful bowlers but the team was largely let down by its batting, with only MacLaren and Ranjitsinhji earning any distinction.

The English team played a total of 23 matches on tour: five Tests; seven first-class matches against state teams; and eleven minor matches against local teams. In the state matches, Stoddart's XI won three, drew three and lost one.

Players
The English party consisted of thirteen players, twelve of whom played for England in the Test series:
 Jack Board (Gloucestershire; wicketkeeper; did not play in any of the Test matches)
 Johnny Briggs (Lancashire)
 Frank Druce (Cambridge University and Surrey)
 Tom Hayward (Surrey)
 J. T. Hearne (Middlesex)
 George Hirst (Yorkshire)
 Archie MacLaren (Lancashire; vice-captain)
 Jack Mason (Kent)
 KS Ranjitsinhji (Sussex)
 Tom Richardson (Surrey)
 Andrew Stoddart (Middlesex; captain)
 Bill Storer (Derbyshire; wicketkeeper)
 Ted Wainwright (Yorkshire)

The following players represented Australia in the Test series:
 Joe Darling (South Australia)
 Syd Gregory (New South Wales)
 Clem Hill (South Australia)
 Bill Howell (New South Wales)
 Frank Iredale (New South Wales)
 Ernie Jones (South Australia)
 Jim Kelly (New South Wales; wicketkeeper)
 Jack Lyons (South Australia)
 Tom McKibbin (New South Wales)
 Charlie McLeod (Victoria)
 Monty Noble (New South Wales)
 Harry Trott (Victoria; captain)
 Hugh Trumble (Victoria)
 Jack Worrall (Victoria)

Test series summary
Australia won the Test series 4–1.

First Test

Second Test

Third Test

Fourth Test

Fifth Test

References

Annual reviews
 Wisden Cricketers' Almanack 1899

Further reading
 Bill Frindall, The Wisden Book of Test Cricket 1877–1978, Wisden, 1979
 Chris Harte, A History of Australian Cricket, Andre Deutsch, 1993
 Ray Robinson, On Top Down Under, Cassell, 1975

External links
 ESPNcricinfo – tour itinerary
 Wisden 1899 Online – England in Australia, 1897–98

1897 in Australian cricket
1897 in English cricket
1898 in Australian cricket
1898 in English cricket
Australian cricket seasons from 1890–91 to 1917–18
1897-98
International cricket competitions from 1888–89 to 1918
1897-98